William MacIntyre was a physician.

William MacIntyre may also refer to:

Triumph (comics), real name William MacIntyre

See also
William McIntyre (disambiguation)